The Official Progressive Albums Chart is a monthly album chart for progressive music sales compiled by the Official Charts Company and launched in September 2015. The first album to top the chart was Currents by Tame Impala.

Number ones

References

External links
Official Progressive Albums Chart Top 30 at the Official Charts Company

British record charts
Lists of number-one albums in the United Kingdom
Progressive music
2015 establishments in the United Kingdom